Carlos Torres may refer to:

Sports

Association football (soccer)
Carlos Torres (Portuguese footballer) (1908–?), Portuguese footballer
Carlos Alberto Torres (1944–2016), Brazilian soccer captain and coach
Carlos Torres (Ecuadorian footballer) (born 1951)
Carlos Torres (Peruvian footballer) (born 1966)
Carlos Alexandre Torres (born 1966), Brazilian footballer
Carlos Torres (footballer, born 1968), Paraguayan footballer
Carlos Torres (referee) (born 1970), Paraguayan football (soccer) referee

Other sports
Carlos Torres (umpire) (born 1978), Venezuelan baseball umpire
Carlos Torres (pitcher) (born 1982), American baseball player
Carlos Torres (cyclist), Venezuelan road cyclist

Others
Carlos Torres (astronomer) (1929–2011), Chilean astronomer at the Cerro El Roble Astronomical Station
Carlos Torres Vila (musician) (1946–2010), Argentinian musician
Carlos Alberto Torres (sociologist) (born 1950), Argentinian/American professor of education at UCLA
Carlos Alberto Torres (Puerto Rican nationalist) (born 1952), Puerto Rican nationalist
Carlos Torres Vila (banker) (born 1966), Spanish banker
Carlos J. Torres Torres (born 1967), Puerto Rican senator
Carlos Torres (actor) (born 1988), Colombian actor